The 1988 Fresno State Bulldogs football team represented California State University, Fresno as a member of the Big West Conference during the 1988 NCAA Division I-A football season. Led by 11th-year head coach Jim Sweeney, Fresno State compiled an overall record of 10–2 with a mark of 7–0 in conference play, winning the Big West title. The Bulldogs played their home games at Bulldog Stadium in Fresno, California.

Fresno State earned their third NCAA Division I-A postseason bowl game berth in 1988. They played the Mid-American Conference (MAC) champion Western Michigan Broncos in the eighth annual California Bowl at Bulldog Stadium on December 18. The Bulldogs won their third consecutives bowl game by beating Western Michigan, 35–30.

Schedule

Team players in the NFL
The following were selected in the 1989 NFL Draft.

References

Fresno State
Fresno State Bulldogs football seasons
Big West Conference football champion seasons
Fresno State Bulldogs football